At the 1928 Summer Olympics in Amsterdam, four diving events were contested.  The men's plain high diving event was dropped from the Olympic program. The competitions were held from Monday, 6 August 1928 to Saturday, 11 August 1928.

Medal summary
The events are labelled as 3 metre springboard and 10 metre platform by the International Olympic Committee, and appeared on the 1928 Official Report as fancy diving and high diving, respectively. The platform events included dives from both 10 metre and 5 metre platforms, while the springboard events included dives from 3 metre and 1 metre springboards.

Men

Women

Participating nations
A total of 61 divers (38 men and 23 women) from 17 nations (men from 16 nations - women from 9 nations) competed at the Amsterdam Games:

  (men:1 women:0)
  (men:1 women:1)
  (men:1 women:0)
  (men:2 women:0)
  (men:0 women:1)
  (men:2 women:0)
  (men:1 women:1)
  (men:3 women:1)
  (men:5 women:4)
  (men:4 women:3)
  (men:3 women:0)
  (men:1 women:0)
  (men:1 women:0)
  (men:3 women:4)
  (men:5 women:3)
  (men:1 women:0)
  (men:4 women:5)

Medal table

References

 
1928 Summer Olympics events
1928
1928 in water sports